Mount Waverley railway station is located on the Glen Waverley line in Victoria, Australia. It serves the south-eastern Melbourne suburb of Mount Waverley, and it opened on 5 May 1930.

History

Mount Waverley station opened on 5 May 1930, when the railway line from East Malvern was extended to Glen Waverley. Like the suburb itself, the station was named after Sir Walter Scott's novel Waverley.

In 1953, the station was closed to goods traffic. In 1955, the current Platform 2 was provided. In 1958, the line to Syndal was duplicated and, in 1964, the line was duplicated to East Malvern. An emergency crossover, located at the Up end of the station, was also provided in that year.

In 1972, the emergency crossover was abolished. In 1975, the current station buildings were provided.

On 18 January 1995, Mount Waverley was the first station on the metropolitan railway system to be upgraded to a Premium Station.

Facilities, platforms and services

Mount Waverley has two side platforms, linked by an underpass at the Up (western) end of the station, and an overpass on Stephenson Road. Platform 1 features a customer service window, an enclosed waiting room and toilets.

It is served by Glen Waverley line trains.

Platform 1:
  all stations and limited express services to Flinders Street

Platform 2:
  all stations services to Glen Waverley

Transport Links

CDC Melbourne operates one route via Mount Waverley station, under contract to Public Transport Victoria:
 : Glen Waverley station – St Kilda

Ventura Bus Lines operates one route via Mount Waverley Station, under contract to Public Transport Victoria:
 : Oakleigh station – Box Hill station

Gallery

References

External links
 
 Melway map at street-directory.com.au

Premium Melbourne railway stations
Railway stations in Melbourne
Railway stations in Australia opened in 1930
Railway stations in the City of Monash